Claudia Guri Moreno (born 1 May 1995 in Escaldes) is an Andorran athlete and former basketball player.
She was the only representative of Andorra at the 2015 World Championships in Athletics in Beijing.

She has also played in the under-16 basketball team of Andorra.

Competition record

Personal bests
Outdoor
100 metres hurdles – 17.15 (+0.9 m/s, Tbilisi 2014)
High jump – 1.79 (Tunis 2016)
Pole vault – 2.40 (Marsa 2010)
Long jump – 5.59 (+0.2 m/s, Beijing 2015)
Triple jump – 12.16 (+1.7 m/s, Castres 2015)
Indoor
800 metres – 2:41.87 (Sabadell 2016)
60 metres hurdles – 9.97 (Sabadell 2016)
High jump – 1.80 (Sabadell 2017)
Long jump – 5.68 (Antequera 2015)
Triple jump – 12.40 (Antequera 2015)
Shot put – 8.74 (Sabadell 2015)
Pentathlon – 3222 (Sabadell 2016)

References

All-Athletics profile

1995 births
Living people
People from Escaldes-Engordany
Andorran women's basketball players
Centers (basketball)
World Athletics Championships athletes for Andorra
Andorran high jumpers
Andorran female long jumpers
Andorran female triple jumpers
European Games competitors for Andorra
Athletes (track and field) at the 2015 European Games